Keith Ingram (born 1955) is an American politician.

Keith Ingram may also refer to:
 Keith Ingram (headmaster) (1929–2007), British headmaster of the Dragon School, 1965–1989
 Keith Ingram, manager of the band Dru Hill

See also
Keith Ingham, pianist